Knut Erik Jensen (born 8 October 1940 in Honningsvåg, Finnmark) is a Norwegian film director, best known for his documentary Cool and Crazy.

Biography
After studying French, Russian and history, Jensen attended the London Film School. In 1978, he joined the Norwegian Broadcasting Corporation (NRK), and has since made documentaries and short films for NRK as well as independently. He is known for the documentary Cool and Crazy.  Jensen has also directed three feature films: Stella Polaris (1993), Burnt by Frost (1997) and Passing Darkness (2000).

In 2008 Jensen was made a Knight, First Class of the Royal Norwegian Order of St. Olav.

References

External links
 

1940 births
Living people
People from Nordkapp
Norwegian film directors
Alumni of the London Film School